The Big East Conference Baseball Coach of the Year award is presented annually to the conference's most outstanding coach, as voted by the conference's coaches at the end of each regular season.  From 1985 to 2013, the award was sponsored by the old Big East Conference.  Since 2014, it has been sponsored by the new Big East.

In 2014 season, Creighton's Ed Servais won the new conference's inaugural award. Creighton had a 30-16 (14-4 Big East) regular season to win the conference title. Three of the last four winners, including Servais, have won or shared the conference's regular season title. From 1999 to 2006, by contrast, only two regular-season champions won the award.

Ed Blankmeyer of St. John's has won the award eight times, a record.  That includes back-to-back awards in 2007 and 2008, a feat matched only by his Red Storm predecessor Joe Russo (1990 and 1991) and Connecticut's Jim Penders (2010 and 2011).

Providence is the only school to have three coaches win the award (Don Mezzanotte in 1986, Paul Kostacopoulos in 1995, and Charlie Hickey in 1999).  Three other schools have had multiple coaches win the award: St. John's (Russo and Blankmeyer), Connecticut (Andy Baylock and Penders), and Pittsburgh (Mark Jackson and Joe Jordano).

Winners

By season

By school
The following is a table of the schools whose coaches have won the award, along with the year each school joined the conference, the number of times it has won the award, and the years in which it has done so.

Notes

References

Big East Conference baseball
NCAA Division I baseball conference coaches of the year